UNISUR is an optical submarine telecommunications cable system in the South Atlantic Ocean linking Argentina, Uruguay, and Brazil.

It has landing points in:
Florianópolis, Santa Catarina State, Brazil
Maldonado, Maldonado Department, Uruguay
Las Toninas, Buenos Aires Province, Argentina

It has a design transmission capacity of 560 Mbit/s and a total cable length of 1,720 km.  It started operation on 16 November 1994.

References

 
 

Submarine communications cables in the South Atlantic Ocean
Argentina–Brazil relations
Argentina–Uruguay relations
Brazil–Uruguay relations
1994 establishments in Argentina
1994 establishments in Brazil
1994 establishments in Uruguay